These are the list of personnel changes in the NBA from the 1967–68 NBA season.

Events

August ?, 1967
 The Chicago Bulls signed Craig Spitzer as a free agent.

August 4, 1967
 The Boston Celtics signed Tom Thacker as a free agent. Thacker was selected by Chicago in the expansion draft but did not sign.

August 31, 1967
 The Detroit Pistons sold Rudy LaRusso to the San Francisco Warriors.

September 5, 1967
 The St. Louis Hawks signed Jim Davis as a free agent.

September 18, 1967
 The Seattle SuperSonics sold Nate Bowman to the New York Knicks.

October 2, 1967
 The Detroit Pistons traded Reggie Harding to the Chicago Bulls for a 1968 3rd round draft pick (Don Dee was later selected).

October 3, 1967
 The San Diego Rockets signed Art Williams as a free agent.

October 20, 1967
The Cincinnati Royals traded Flynn Robinson, a 1968 2nd round draft pick (Ron Dunlap was later selected) and a 1969 2nd round draft pick (Johnny Baum was later selected) to the Chicago Bulls for Guy Rodgers.

October 21, 1967
 The Los Angeles Lakers signed Dennis Hamilton as a free agent.

October 29, 1967
 The New York Knicks waived Jim Caldwell.

November 1, 1967
 The Chicago Bulls signed Ken Wilburn as a free agent.

November 27, 1967
 The Cincinnati Royals traded Len Chappell to the Detroit Pistons for a 1968 3rd round draft pick (Fred Foster was later selected).

December 27, 1967
 The New York Knicks fired Dick McGuire as head coach.
 The New York Knicks hired Red Holzman as head coach.

January 9, 1968
 The Chicago Bulls traded Erwin Mueller to the Los Angeles Lakers for Jim Barnes and a 1968 3rd round draft pick (Dave Newmark was later selected).

January 11, 1968
 The San Diego Rockets traded Johnny Green to the Philadelphia 76ers for a 1968 4th round draft pick (Darryl Jones was later selected).

January 12, 1968
 The New York Knicks sold Freddie Crawford to the Los Angeles Lakers.

January 21, 1968
 The St. Louis Hawks traded Tom Workman and a 1968 3rd round draft pick (Jack Thompson was later selected) to the Baltimore Bullets for Don Ohl.

February 1, 1968
 The Cincinnati Royals traded Jim Fox and Happy Hairston to the Detroit Pistons for John Tresvant and Tom Van Arsdale.
 The San Diego Rockets signed Bud Acton as a free agent.

April 24, 1968
Red Kerr resigns as head coach for Chicago Bulls.
 The Phoenix Suns hired Red Kerr as head coach.

May 2, 1968
 The Los Angeles Lakers signed Jay Carty as a free agent.

May 6, 1968
 The Phoenix Suns drafted John Barnhill from the San Diego Rockets in the NBA expansion draft.
 The Phoenix Suns drafted Em Bryant from the New York Knicks in the NBA expansion draft.
 The Milwaukee Bucks drafted Len Chappell from the Detroit Pistons in the NBA expansion draft.
 The Milwaukee Bucks drafted Larry Costello from the Philadelphia 76ers in the NBA expansion draft.
 The Milwaukee Bucks drafted Johnny Egan from the Baltimore Bullets in the NBA expansion draft.
 The Milwaukee Bucks drafted Wayne Embry from the Boston Celtics in the NBA expansion draft.
 The Milwaukee Bucks drafted Dave Gambee from the San Diego Rockets in the NBA expansion draft.
 The Phoenix Suns drafted Gail Goodrich from the Los Angeles Lakers in the NBA expansion draft.
 The Milwaukee Bucks drafted Gary Gray from the Cincinnati Royals in the NBA expansion draft.
 The Phoenix Suns drafted Dennis Hamilton from the Los Angeles Lakers in the NBA expansion draft.
 The Milwaukee Bucks drafted Fred Hetzel from the San Francisco Warriors in the NBA expansion draft.
 The Phoenix Suns drafted Neil Johnson from the New York Knicks in the NBA expansion draft.
 The Milwaukee Bucks drafted Johnny Jones from the Boston Celtics in the NBA expansion draft.
 The Phoenix Suns drafted Dave Lattin from the San Francisco Warriors in the NBA expansion draft.
 The Phoenix Suns drafted Paul Long from the Detroit Pistons in the NBA expansion draft.
 The Milwaukee Bucks drafted Bob Love from the Cincinnati Royals in the NBA expansion draft.
 The Milwaukee Bucks drafted Jon McGlocklin from the San Diego Rockets in the NBA expansion draft.
 The Phoenix Suns drafted Stan McKenzie (basketball) from the Baltimore Bullets in the NBA expansion draft.
 The Phoenix Suns drafted McCoy McLemore from the Chicago Bulls in the NBA expansion draft.
 The Phoenix Suns drafted Bill Melchionni from the Philadelphia 76ers in the NBA expansion draft.
 The Milwaukee Bucks drafted Jay Miller from the St. Louis Hawks in the NBA expansion draft.
 The Milwaukee Bucks drafted Bud Olsen from the Seattle SuperSonics in the NBA expansion draft.
 The Milwaukee Bucks drafted George Patterson from the Detroit Pistons in the NBA expansion draft.
 The Milwaukee Bucks drafted Jim Reid from the Philadelphia 76ers in the NBA expansion draft.
 The Milwaukee Bucks drafted Guy Rodgers from the Cincinnati Royals in the NBA expansion draft.
 The Phoenix Suns drafted Dave Schellhase from the Chicago Bulls in the NBA expansion draft.
 The Phoenix Suns drafted Dick Snyder from the St. Louis Hawks in the NBA expansion draft.
 The Phoenix Suns drafted Craig Spitzer from the Chicago Bulls in the NBA expansion draft.
 The Milwaukee Bucks drafted Tom Thacker from the Boston Celtics in the NBA expansion draft.
 The Phoenix Suns drafted Gene Tormohlen from the St. Louis Hawks in the NBA expansion draft.
 The Phoenix Suns drafted Dick Van Arsdale from the New York Knicks in the NBA expansion draft.
 The Milwaukee Bucks drafted Bob Warlick from the San Francisco Warriors in the NBA expansion draft.
 The Milwaukee Bucks drafted Bob Weiss from the Seattle SuperSonics in the NBA expansion draft.
 The Phoenix Suns drafted Roland West from the Baltimore Bullets in the NBA expansion draft.
 The Phoenix Suns drafted John Wetzel from the Los Angeles Lakers in the NBA expansion draft.
 The Phoenix Suns drafted George Wilson from the Seattle SuperSonics in the NBA expansion draft.

May 14, 1968
 The San Francisco Warriors hired George Lee as head coach.

References
NBA Transactions at NBA.com
1967-68 NBA Transactions| Basketball-Reference.com

Transactions
NBA transactions